Galium species (bedstraws) are used as food plants by the larvae of a number of Lepidoptera species:

Monophagous
Species which feed exclusively on Galium

 Geometridae
 Epirrhoe alternata (common carpet)
 Eulithis pyraliata (barred straw)

Polyphagous
Species which feed on Galium among other plants

 Geometridae
 Eupithecia centaureata (lime-speck pug)
 Eupithecia subfuscata (grey pug)
 Eupithecia vulgata (common pug)
 Idaea aversata (riband wave)
 Orthonama obstipata (gem) – leaves
 Semiothisa clathrata (latticed heath)
 Xanthorhoe montanata (silver-ground carpet)
 Noctuidae
 Amphipyra tragopoginis (mouse moth)
 Axylia putris (flame)
 Cucullia umbratica (shark) – recorded on lady's bedstraw (G. verum)
 Eugnorisma glareosa (autumnal rustic)
 Ochropleura plecta (flame shoulder)
 Xestia xanthographa (square-spot rustic)
 Sphingidae
 Deilephila elpenor (elephant hawk-moth)
 Macroglossum stellatarum (hummingbird hawk-moth)
 Hyles gallii (bedstraw hawk-moth)

External links

Galium
+Lepidoptera